Eudonia cymatias is a moth in the family Crambidae. It was named by Meyrick in 1884. This species is endemic to New Zealand.

The wingspan is 21–22 mm. The forewings are fuscous grey, mixed with white and irrorated with black. The hindwings are pale whitish-grey, slightly tinged with ochreous. The postmedian line and a slender hindmarginal suffusion are darker grey. Adults have been recorded on wing in January.

References

Moths described in 1885
Eudonia
Moths of New Zealand
Endemic fauna of New Zealand
Taxa named by Edward Meyrick
Endemic moths of New Zealand